Personales was an order of dicotyledons in the Hutchinson system.  

In the current APG system these families generally belong to the order Lamiales in the Astrid clade.

Families
It consisted of the following families:
 Acanthaceae
 Bignoniaceae
 Columelliaceae
 Gesneriaceae
 Lentibulariaceae
 Orobanchaceae
 Pedaliaceae
 Scrophulariaceae

See also

References

Historically recognized angiosperm orders